Radio Biafra, also known as Voice of Biafra, is a radio station that was founded by the government of the unrecognized Republic of Biafra(government that is led by MASSOB in 1999). It is now operated by Mazi Nnamdi Kanu. It is believed to have its first transmission before the Nigeria-Biafra war, the radio station was instrumental in the broadcast of speeches and propaganda by Chukwuemeka Odumegwu Ojukwu to the people of the Republic of Biafra.

Transmission
Now based in the United Kingdom, Radio Biafra transmits via the internet and shortwave broadcast targeted to the Eastern Nigeria, with their contents broadcast in English and Igbo. Radio Biafra claims to be broadcasting the ideology of Biafra –"Freedom of the Biafran people".

Controversy
Radio Biafra has been met with mixed reactions. While some critics have criticized the station for "inciting war" through its programmes and "preaching hate messages" against Nigeria which it refers to as a “zoo”, an editor for Sahara Reporters wrote in defence of the radio station after he compared Radio Biafra with the British Broadcasting Corporation Hausa service.

On 14 July 2015, it was reported in the media that the radio station had been jammed because it did not have a broadcast licence from the Nigerian Broadcasting Commission. However, the radio station in a swift reaction labelled such claims as "lies" and went on to release its new frequency details to the public.

References

Biafra
Urban contemporary radio stations